Jacket wrestling is a form of wrestling and one of the oldest form of sports that has been practiced in both Europe and Asia going back many centuries. It generally involves two contestants wearing jackets and belts attempting to take each other down in an attempt to pin their opponent. The style of combat is typified by a lack of groundfighting, due to the rules often causing an opponent to lose if they touch the ground with something other than their feet. 
The method of combat has also been referred to as "belt-and-jacket wrestling", for its common use of a belt or sash in addition to or instead of a jacket.

The two most popular contested styles of jacket wrestling today are Judo and Sambo.

History 
Encyclopædia Britannica has stated that, "The three basic types of wrestling contest are the belt-and-jacket, catch-hold, and loose styles, all of which appear to have originated in antiquity. Belt-and-jacket styles of wrestling are those in which the clothing of the wrestlers provides the principal means of taking a grip on the opponent."

Thomas A. Green and Joseph R. Svinth stated in 2010 that, it has been recorded as a method of combat as early as the Middle Ages. Scot Beekman stated in 2006 that, Jacket wrestling became especially popular in Britain, where different regions developed their own forms of jacket wrestling rules and combat.

See also
Alysh
Belt wrestling
Collar-and-elbow
Cornish wrestling
Cumberland and Westmorland wrestling
Folk wrestling
Glima
Gouren
Khuresh
Mongolian wrestling
Scottish Backhold
Shuai jiao

References

Jacket